"Famous" is the title track and first single on the third studio album by post-grunge band Puddle of Mudd. The song was sent out to rock radio on May 11, 2007 and was officially released on May 21.

In the song, lead singer Wes Scantlin, sings about wanting to be famous, for the perks that come along with that life. It has drawn comparisons to Nickelback's "Rockstar" because "Rockstar" is also about wanting to achieve celebrity status.

Single

Track listings
Single

EP

Charts
"Famous" did very well, hitting #1 at Rock Radio and also reached #18 on the Bubbling Under Hot 100 singles chart, which is equivalent to #118.

References

Puddle of Mudd songs
2007 singles
Songs written by Brian Howes
Songs written by Doug Ardito
Songs written by Wes Scantlin
2007 songs
Geffen Records singles